Brad Nicholson (born 4 June 1974) is a former Australian rules footballer who played with Footscray in the Australian Football League (AFL).

Nicholson, originally from Doncaster Heights, was recruited from TAC Cup team the Eastern Ranges, he was primarily a back pocket defender but was used at time as a fullback early in his career.

He was a nominated for the 1993 AFL Rising Star, after playing his four league game against the West Coast Eagles. His most productive year came in 1995 when he made 16 appearances, but it was his penultimate season.

References

External links
 
 

1974 births
Australian rules footballers from Victoria (Australia)
Western Bulldogs players
Eastern Ranges players
Living people